Kim Seung-hwan (also transliterated Kim Sung-hwan, born 15 May 1960) is a South Korean equestrian. He competed at the 1988 Summer Olympics and the 1992 Summer Olympics.

References

External links
 

1960 births
Living people
South Korean male equestrians
Olympic equestrians of South Korea
Equestrians at the 1988 Summer Olympics
Equestrians at the 1992 Summer Olympics
Asian Games medalists in equestrian
Asian Games bronze medalists for South Korea
Equestrians at the 1986 Asian Games
Medalists at the 1986 Asian Games
Place of birth missing (living people)